Kfar or KFAR may refer to:

 Kfar, a component of Hebrew placenames literally meaning "village"
 KFAR, a radio station in Fairbanks, Alaska, United States
 KATN, a television station in Fairbanks, Alaska, which had the call letters KFAR-TV from 1955 to 1981
 KFAR, ICAO code for Hector International Airport